Sein Lyan Tun is a short film director from Myanmar who has won international awards. He focuses on making documentaries and short films about youth and women with a concern for education, child labour, abuse and human trafficking. His documentary work Unsilent Potato is well recognized in Myanmar and Southeast Asia. He also directed and co-produced TV documentary for Inside Lens, NHK World's new documentary strand, it specializes in Japan and Asia and Color of Asia, Southeast Asia Program NHK.  He is also script supervisor and program director for "Samsung Scholarship" TV Program which was shown every Saturday at 4pm on the MRTV-4 television channel from 2014. He worked as Traveling Film Festival Coordinator at Human Rights Human Dignity International Film Festival, Yangon until 2015. He became the alumni of “Talents Tokyo”, Southeast Asia Film Lab in 2016 and “Tie That Bind” in 2017 and "American Film Showcase" and  “Autumn Meeting Director workshop with director Tran Anh Hung in 2019.

Filmography 

 Late Blooming In A Lonely Summer (Short Film) 20 min (2021)
 For Me And Others Like Me (Documentary) 30 min (2020)
We Are Nuns (TV Documentary) 28 min (2019) NHK
An Ordinary Marriage (Short Film) 13 min (2018)
Dream Over Monsoon (TV Documentary) 25 min (2017 ) NHK
Rays Of Amour (Documentary) 22 min (2017)
BORDER BOY (TV Documentary) 28 min (2016) NHK
Reborn (Short Film) 9 min (2016)
Unsilent Potato (Documentary) 22 min (2016)
Rula (Short Film) 8 min (2015)
Charred Brick (Short Documentary) 15 min (2015)
Youth and Education  (Documentary) 5 min (2013)
 Exit  (Short Film) 3 min 2013

Awards

References 

Year of birth missing (living people)
Living people
Burmese film directors